Killickia is a genus of flowering plants belonging to the family Lamiaceae.

Its native range is KwaZulu-Natal.

Species:

Killickia compacta 
Killickia grandiflora 
Killickia lutea 
Killickia pilosa

References

Lamiaceae
Lamiaceae genera